The Great Silver Eye: An Anthology is a compilation album by Portuguese gothic metal band Moonspell, released on 29 June 2007. It contains the band's most well-known songs.

Track listing 
 "Wolfshade (A Werewolf Masquerade)" – 7:44
 "Vampiria" – 5:36
 "Alma Mater" – 5:37
 "Opium" – 2:47
 "Raven Claws" – 3:16
 "Full Moon Madness" – 6:47
 "2econd Skin" – 4:51
 "Magdalene" – 6:17
 "Soulsick" – 4:16
 "Lustmord" – 3:45
 "Firewalking" – 3:06
 "Nocturna" – 3:52
 "Everything Invaded" – 6:17
 "Capricorn at Her Feet" – 6:05
 "Finisterra" – 4:09
 "Luna" – 4:43

Personnel 
Group
 Fernando Ribeiro – lead vocals
 Duarte Picoto (Mantus) – guitars (tracks 1–3)
 João Pereira (Tanngrisnir) – guitars, backing vocals (tracks 1–3)
 Ricardo Amorim – guitars (tracks 4–16)
 João Pedro Escoval (Ares) – bass (tracks 1–6)
 Sérgio Crestana – bass (tracks 7–12)
 Pedro Paixão – keyboards (all tracks), guitars (tracks 13–16)
 Miguel Gaspar – drums

Other musicians
 Niclas Etelävuori – bass (tracks 13–14)
 Waldemar Sorychta – bass (tracks 15–16)

References

External links 
 Moonspell band website

Moonspell albums
2007 compilation albums
SPV/Steamhammer compilation albums